Andrés Torres (born 3 May 1948) is a Puerto Rican boxer. He competed in the men's bantamweight event at the 1968 Summer Olympics. At the 1968 Summer Olympics, he lost to Giuseppe Mura of Italy.

References

External links
 

1948 births
Living people
Puerto Rican male boxers
Olympic boxers of Puerto Rico
Boxers at the 1968 Summer Olympics
People from Corozal, Puerto Rico
Bantamweight boxers
20th-century Puerto Rican people